Nimbus Roman is a serif typeface created by URW Studio in 1982.

Nimbus Roman No. 9 L is a serif typeface created by URW Studio in 1987, and eventually released under the GPL and AFPL (as Type 1 font for Ghostscript) in 1996 and LPPL in 2009. It features Normal, Bold, Italic, and Bold Italic weights, and is one of several freely licensed fonts offered by URW++.

Although the characters are not exactly the same, Nimbus Roman No. 9 L has metrics almost identical to Times New Roman and Times Roman.
It is one of the Ghostscript fonts, a free alternative to 35 basic PostScript fonts (which include Times).

It is a standard typeface in many Linux distributions.

See also
Nimbus Mono L
Nimbus Sans L
Free software Unicode typefaces

References

External links
URW++ Homepage 
URW++ Nimbus Roman - commercial version
URW++ Nimbus Roman Global  - commercial version
URW++ Nimbus Roman No. 9  - commercial version
URW++ Nimbus Roman No. 9 L - commercial version
Ghostscript Git - URW fonts (Type 1, OTF and TTF fonts)
Nimbus Roman No. 9 L-Regular - font metrics
Ghostscript changelog (includes changes in Nimbus fonts)
Fonts and font facilities supplied with Ghostscript
Guide to Pre-Installed Fonts in Linux, Mac, and Windows (2007)

Transitional serif typefaces
Open-source typefaces
Typefaces and fonts introduced in 1982